Soldiers Hill is a suburb in the City of Mount Isa, Queensland, Australia.

Geography 
The Leichhard River flows north-south through the town of Mount Isa, dividing the suburbs of the town into "mineside" (west of the Leichhardt River) and "townside" (east of the Leichhardt River). Soldiers Creek is a "mineside" suburb.

History 
Soldiers Hill was named on 1 September 1973 by the Queensland Place Names Board. On 16 March 2001 its status was changed from locality to suburb.

Education 
Barkly Highway State School is a government primary (Early Childhood-6) school for boys and girls at 17 Bougainville Street. In 2017, the school had an enrolment of 410 students with 31 teachers and 17 non-teaching staff (12 full-time equivalent). It includes a special education program.

Reference 

City of Mount Isa
Suburbs in Queensland